The Spa Road Junction rail crash was an accident on the British railway system which occurred during the peak evening rush hour of 8 January 1999 at Spa Road Junction in Bermondsey, in South East London.

The incident

On a dark and wet evening, a Connex South Eastern train from Dover Priory to Charing Cross collided with a Thameslink train from Brighton to Bedford causing derailment to both trains. The accident resulted in no fatalities and four injuries. The British Transport Police reported that eight passengers had been taken to hospital with minor bumps, bruises and whiplash but none were detained. One of the uninjured passengers complained that the Train Operating Companies had failed to provide support after the crash. He was awarded compensation in a court case but commented "And there I believe the matter will rest until the next rail crash when we the long-suffering passengers should be aware that unless we are carted off to hospital we will have to fend for ourselves wherever we are dumped".

Connex Rail admitted that its driver passed the signal at danger although the existing Automatic Warning System was working. Following this and other similar accidents Railtrack was given six months to develop a plan to roll out the new Train Protection & Warning System which would automatically apply the brakes if a train passed a red signal.

The Thameslink train had been held at a danger (red) signal until the route was set for it to cross from the Brighton Main Line onto the London Bridge Up Loop Line, and the signal then cleared. The Connex train, which was approaching from behind, passed a preliminary caution (double yellow) signal then a caution (yellow) signal and then a danger (red) signal. It continued for 283 metres (309 yards) past the red signal until the point where the two lines converged. Both trains were derailed and damage was caused to most of the carriages.

Disruption was caused to other rail services, although trains continued to run past the accident site on the Cannon Street lines. The emergency services struggled to access the accident scene but eventually 282 people were evacuated from these two trains. Some 200 people from another train a short distance behind (Connex South Central service from London Bridge to Guildford train) were initially left unsupervised, and had to find their own way to evacuate themselves in the inclement weather. Some were evacuated via the disused Spa Road railway station buildings, the former terminus of the South East & Chatham Railway.

The driver of the Connex train had already passed a signal at danger without authority on a previous occasion, and was still under special supervision because of this. Following the accident, he was permanently removed from driving duties.

There was no history of previous Category A SPADs at this signal.

Junction layout

Spa Road Junction is a busy ladder-crossover, located a short distance south east of  station. It controls the crossing movements to and from London Bridge (High Level) station, and at the time of the collision in 1999 the line configuration was:
 
Line 1 Down (from Cannon Street via London Bridge)
Line 2 Reversible (to/from Cannon Street via London Bridge)
Line 3 Up (to Cannon Street via London Bridge)
Line 4 Down (from Charing Cross via London Bridge)
Line 5 Down (from Charing Cross via London Bridge)
Line 6 Up (To Charing Cross via London Bridge)
Line 7 Up Passenger Loop (To Charing Cross via London Bridge or Platform Avoiding loop)

Infrastructure
All signals in the vicinity of Spa Road junction are 4 aspect colour light signals. The signalling method is Track circuit Block, controlled by London Bridge signalling centre which is located nearby, adjacent to platform 16 at London Bridge station.

The collision point 
The Thameslink train was approaching London Bridge from New Cross Gate on the Up Fast line of the Brighton Main Line, and had been signalled to cross on to the Up Passenger Loop of the South Eastern Main Line at Spa Road junction. The Connex South Eastern train was approaching Spa Road from New Cross and had received the correct signalling sequence of a Preliminary Caution (two yellow aspect signal) and Caution (single yellow aspect signal) prior to L154 (the signal protecting the junction) being at Danger. However the driver did not respond to the signals and failed stop his train at the Danger signal, continuing until his train collided with the Thameslink train at the trailing points.

Rolling stock
The Thameslink train was an eight-coach train consisting of two Class 319 four-coach electric multiple units (EMUs).

The Connex South Eastern was also an eight-coach train consisting of a four-coach Class 411 (411602) EMU and a four-coach Class 423 EMU. The class 411 unit was repaired at Eastleigh Works and became the only class 411 EMU in Connex livery as a result.

Investigation

The Health and Safety Executive (HSE) concluded that the accident was caused by the Connex train passing a signal at danger (red). The HSE concluded that this was probably due to human error as no evidence of malfunction was found in any equipment tested.

The investigation of the accident found "deficiencies" in the training and experience of staff in dealing with emergency situations. The cause of the accident was concluded to be driver error due to poor staff training.

One anomaly was that the "Sunflower" display in the cab of the Connex train was showing the all-black "clear" indication (meaning that the last signal which had been passed was displaying a green aspect). However the HSE report concluded that the Automatic Warning System (AWS) on both trains was probably working correctly, and that the shock of the collision had caused the electro-mechanical indicator to change. In any case, even if the AWS had given a wrong indication this would not have absolved the driver of the Connex train of his duty to observe and obey the signals.

The conclusion was that the Train Protection & Warning System might have stopped or at least slowed the Connex train down if it had been installed. The Railway Safety Regulations 1999 were introduced in the August, which stipulated that train protection must be implemented throughout the network by the end of 2003. The regulations stopped short of requiring Automatic Train Protection (ATP) to be installed.

References

External links
 Railways Archive – Accident at Spa Road (Summary)
 Railways Archive – Report by the Health and Safety Executive's Railway Inspectorate into the train accident at Spa Road (PDF)

 

Transport in the London Borough of Southwark
Transport in the London Borough of Lewisham
Railway accidents and incidents in London
Railway accidents in 1999
1999 in London
Bermondsey
Railway accidents involving a signal passed at danger
Derailments in England
Accidents and incidents involving Connex South Eastern
Accidents and incidents involving Thameslink
January 1999 events in the United Kingdom
Train collisions in England
Rail accidents caused by a driver's error